South Leith railway station served the area of Leith, Edinburgh, Scotland from 1832 to 1903 on the Edinburgh and Dalkeith Railway.

History 
The station opened in 1832 by the Edinburgh and Dalkeith Railway as Leith station.  The station closed in 1846 but reopened on 1 October 1859 and was renamed South Leith on the same day. It closed again to passengers and goods traffic on 1 July 1903.

References

External links 

Disused railway stations in Edinburgh
Former North British Railway stations
Railway stations in Great Britain opened in 1832
Railway stations in Great Britain closed in 1846
Railway stations in Great Britain opened in 1859
Railway stations in Great Britain closed in 1903
1832 establishments in Scotland
1903 disestablishments in Scotland